The World of Wodehouse is a comedy television series, based on the Blandings Castle and Ukridge stories written by P. G. Wodehouse.

The series, which followed the television series The World of Wooster, was shown on BBC Television. It consisted of two series, the 1967 Blandings Castle series (six episodes) and the 1968 Ukridge series (seven episodes).

Apart from one or more extracts from one episode of Blandings Castle ("Lord Emsworth and the Girl Friend"), all episodes of both Blandings Castle and Ukridge are lost.

Cast members

Blandings Castle
 Ralph Richardson as Lord Emsworth (6 episodes)
 Meriel Forbes as Lady Constance Keeble (6 episodes)
 Stanley Holloway as Beach (6 episodes)
 Jack Radcliffe as McAllister (6 episodes)
 Derek Nimmo as Freddie Threepwood (3 episodes)

Ukridge

 Anton Rodgers as Stanley Ukridge (7 episodes)
 Julian Holloway as Corky (7 episodes)
 Marian Spencer as Aunt Julia (4 episodes)
 Kenneth Thornett as Bowles (3 episodes)
 Noel Davis as Tupper (3 episodes)
 Hugh Latimer as Barter (3 episodes)

Background and production

The World of Wodehouse was created as a result of the success of the BBC television series The World of Wooster, which aired from May 1965 to
November 1967. The six episodes of the Blandings Castle series, which aired in early 1967, were screened before the third series of The World of Wooster, which was broadcast later that year.

Michael Mills and Frank Muir produced the episodes based on P. G. Wodehouse's Blandings Castle stories, which were adapted by John Chapman. Joan Kemp-Welch produced the episodes based on Wodehouse's Ukridge stories, which were adapted by Richard Waring. The episodes for both series were each approximately 30 minutes long.

Exterior shots of Blandings Castle were filmed at Penshurst Place.

The music for the Blandings Castle series was composed by Ron Grainer. Arthur Wilkinson composed the music for the Ukridge series.

Penguin Books, which had previously published Jeeves books with covers featuring full-colour promotional images from The World of Wooster, published tie-in Blandings books with covers featuring promotional images from The World of Wodehouse in December 1966.

Derek Nimmo, who played Freddie Threepwood in the Blandings Castle series, also played Bingo Little in several episodes of The World of Wooster. Both Anton Rodgers and Julian Holloway, who played Ukridge and Corky respectively in the Ukridge series, had previously played other roles in the third series of The World of Wooster. Rodgers also portrayed Rupert Baxter in the third episode of the Blandings Castle series, "Lord Emsworth and the Crime Wave at Blandings".

Episodes

Series overview

Blandings Castle (1967)

Ukridge (1968)

See also
 List of Wodehouse's Ukridge characters

References
Notes

Sources
 

1967 British television series debuts
1968 British television series endings
Television shows based on works by P. G. Wodehouse
BBC television comedy
Lost BBC episodes
1960s British comedy television series